The 2023 Robert Morris Colonials football team represented the Robert Morris University during the 2023 NCAA Division I FCS football season. Led by sixth-year head coach Bernard Clark, the Colonials play their home games at the Joe Walton Stadium in Moon Township, Pennsylvania.

Previous season

The Colonels finished the 2022 season with a record of 0–11, 0–5 Big South play to finish in last place in the Big South.

Schedule

References

Robert Morris
Robert Morris Colonials football seasons
Robert Morris Colonials football